Ioannis Permeniates (?-1550) also known as Giovanni Permeniate, Joannes Permeniates and, Zuan Permeniatis.  He was a Greek painter in Venice active during the early 16th century.  His most popular painting is The Virgin and Child Enthroned.  He was a Greek icon painter who attempted to escape the maniera greca. His icons exhibit qualities of both Venetian and Cretan styles. Exhibiting a more refined maniera greca, he eschews the simplicity of Duccio and Cimabue, and adds more space to his paintings.

History

Ioannis Permeniates was probably born in Canadia and migrated to Venice.  Not much is known about the painter.  An archive in Venice indicates that the he was a member of the local Greek community in the city.  The painter signed some of his icons ΧΕΙΡ ΙΩ(ΑΝΝ)ΟΥ ΤΟΥ ΠΕΡΜΕΝΙΩΤ(ΟΥ) by the hand of Ioannis Permeniotis.  His famous piece Virgin Enthroned with St. John the Baptist and St. Augustine was signed with Latin capitals: IOANES PERMENIATES/ P..  The painting is housed in the Museo Civico Correr in Venice.  Permeniatis also painted:  Saint Peter, Saint Francis, and Saint Dominic, which is located in the art museum in Vicenza.

Gallery

Notable Works
Madonna and Child enthroned with St. John the Baptist and St. Augustine (Permeniates)

See also
Greek scholars in the Renaissance
Fra Angelico
Giotto di Bondone
Victor (painter)
Marco Basaiti

References

1500 births
1550 deaths
Cretan Renaissance painters
Greek Renaissance humanists
16th-century Greek people
16th-century Greek painters